Kat and the Band is a 2020 British coming-of-age musical film directed by E. E. Hegarty from a screenplay by Jemma Field and Michael Müller. The film stars Ella Hunt, Dougie Poynter, Jennifer Leong, Callum McGowan, Idris Debrand, Sevan Stephan, Joanna David, Badly Drawn Boy, Jackson Bews, Katherine Kelly, and Rufus Hound. It premiered at the London Independent Film Festival in March 2020 and was released in the United Kingdom on July 13, 2020, by 101 Films. The film follows Kat Malone, a seventeen year old music-obsessed school girl who tricks her way into managing struggling band Dollar Days by posing to be a twenty-something band manager.

Cast 

 Ella Hunt as Kat Malone
 Dougie Poynter as Alex
 Jennifer Leong as Jane
 Callum McGowan as Brian
 Idris Debrand as Sid
 Sevan Stephan as Faz
 Joanna David as Gran
 Badly Drawn Boy as himself
 Jackson Bews as Marcus
 Katherine Kelly as Liz Malone
 Rufus Hound as Mr. Cato

References

External links 
 
 Kat and the Band on The Film Festival Doctor

2020 films
2020s English-language films
2020s coming-of-age films
British coming-of-age films
2020s British films